Iver Georg Lawson (July 1, 1879 – November 9, 1960) was a world champion cyclist.

Biography
Iver Lawson was born on July 1, 1879, in Norrköping, Sweden to Lars Gustaf Larsson and Emma Sofia Sundberg.  He had two brothers, Gus Lawson and John Lawson.

In 1901 Lawson won the ten-mile championship in Buffalo, New York. In 1902 he lost to Frank Louis Kramer.

In 1905 Lawson also won the National Cycle Association's quarter-mile championship race at Vailsburg in Newark, New Jersey.

In an incident, which occurred in February 1904 at an event in Australia, Major Taylor (an African American cyclist) was seriously injured on the final turn of a race when fellow competitor Lawson deliberately veered his bicycle toward Taylor and collided with his front wheel. Taylor crashed and lay unconscious on the track before he was taken to a local hospital and later made a full recovery. Lawson was suspended from racing anywhere in the world for a year as a result of his actions.

Lawson died on November 9, 1960, in Provo, Utah, after falling from a window.

Footnotes

External links
 
 

1879 births
1960 deaths
Swedish emigrants to the United States
American track cyclists
American male cyclists
Sportspeople from Norrköping
Swedish male cyclists